The 26th Billboard Latin Music Awards ceremony, presented by Billboard magazine, honored the best performing Latin recordings of 2018 and took place on April 25, 2019 at the Mandalay Bay Events Center in Las Vegas. Billboard presented awards in 59 categories. The ceremony was televised in the United States by Telemundo for the 21st time, and was the culmination of the Billboard Latin Music Conference. The awards recognize the most popular Latin performers, songs, albums, labels, songwriters and producers in the United States. Recipients were based on sales, radio airplay, online streaming and social data during a one-year period.

Venezuelan actress, model and presenter Gaby Espino hosted the ceremony. Throughout the show, Espino was joined by Bad Bunny, Carlos Vives, Mark Tacher and Luis Fonsi as co-hosts.

Ozuna led the list of nominations for the 2019 Billboard Latin Music Awards, with 23 nods in 15 categories — a record number in the history of the awards. Ozuna was the biggest winner of the night, with eleven awards.

Performers

Presenters 

 Gaby Espino and Bad Bunny – presented Duo/Group Hot Latin Songs Artist of the Year
 Erick Elías and Betty Torres – presented Airplay Song of the Year
 Kany García and Jorge Salinas – presented Latin Rhythm Artist of the Year
 Ana María Polo and Lupillo Rivera – presented New Artist of the Year
 Isabela Moner and Eugenio Derbez – presented Tropical Song of the Year
 Luis Fonsi – presented Latin Pop Duo/Group of the Year
 ChocQuibTown – presented Regional Mexican Duo/Artist of the Year
 Pedro Capó – presented Digital Song of the Year
 Gente de Zona – presented Female Hot Latin Songs Artist of the Year
 Lali and Fonseca – presented Regional Mexican Song of the Year
 Leila Cobo and Regulo Caro – presented Latin Pop Song of the Year
 Juanes – presented Lifetime achievement award
 Sebastián Yatra – presented Tropical Duo/Group of the Year
 Becky G and Raymix – presented Social Artist of the Year
 Sofía Reyes – presented Tropical Artist of the Year

Billboard Lifetime achievement award
Juan Luis Guerra

Winners and nominees

The nominees for the 26th Billboard Latin Music Awards were announced on February 12, 2019 J Balvin and Shakira led the nominations with 12 each. Ozuna leads the list of nominations with 23 nods in 15 categories — a record number in the history of the awards. He is followed in number of finalist slots by J Balvin and Nicky Jam, with 13 each, Bad Bunny with 12, and Daddy Yankee with 8.

Complete list of winners

Awards

Multiple nominations and awards
The following received multiple nominations:

Twenty-three:
Ozuna
Thirteen:
J Balvin
Nicky Jam
Twelve:
Bad Bunny
Eight:
Daddy Yankee
Six:
Cásper Mágico
Darell
Nio García

Five:
Banda MS
DJ Snake
Four
Anuel AA
Cardi B
Raymix
Reik
Shakira
Three:
CNCO
Karol G
Maluma
Piso 21
Selena Gomez
T3R Elemento
Wisin

Two:
Aventura
Calibre 50
Carlos Vives
Demi Lovato
Drake
Enrique Iglesias
Jennifer Lopez
La Sonora Dinamita
Los Plebes del Rancho de Ariel Camacho
Natti Natasha
Rosalía
Sebastián Yatra
Zion & Lennox

The following received multiple awards:

Eleven:
Ozuna
Five:
Nicky Jam
Four
Bad Bunny

Three:
Banda MS
Cásper Mágico
CNCO
Darell
Nío García

Two:
J Balvin
Romeo Santos
Shakira

References

2019 in Latin music
2019 awards in the United States
2019 in Nevada
April 2019 events in the United States
2019